Samuel Auchmuty Dickson (1817 – 1870) was an Irish Conservative politician.

Dickson was the grandson of Samuel Dickson of Ballinaguile, Croagh, Co Limerick. His father was Major General William Dickson who married Harriet Dallas in 1816. Samuel was born in Madras in 1817 where his father was in the army. Samuel entered the army as an Ensign in the 32nd Ft in 1835. He became a Lieutenant in 1839 and was a Lieutenant Colonel by 1854.
Dickson made several unsuccessful attempts to be elected for parliament—at County Limerick in 1850, Reading in 1852, and Kingston upon Hull in 1854—before he won at County Limerick at the 1859 general election where he beat Edward John Synan. He held the seat until 1865 when he did not seek re-election. In 1855 the Chief Herald of Ireland granted him a confirmation of arms through his grandfather.

References

External links
 

1817 births
1870 deaths
Irish Conservative Party MPs
Members of the Parliament of the United Kingdom for County Limerick constituencies (1801–1922)
UK MPs 1859–1865